The Inhaúma class are a series of five corvettes operated by the Brazilian Navy. These ships were built in Brazil and designed with assistance from the German company Marine Technik. It was originally planned to build 12 to 16 ships but the economic situation in Brazil did not permit this and only five vessels were built. The first two ships were constructed at the Arsenal de Marinha in Rio de Janeiro, the second pair by Verolme. The programme was considerably delayed due to funding issues and the Brazilian Verolme yard's insolvency in 1991 which forced Júlio de Noronha and Frontin to be completed by Arsenal da Marinha. The first ship entered service in 1989 and the last in 2008. Three of the five ships have been taken out of service and one was sunk in a missile exercise in the Atlantic Ocean in 2016.

Design and description
The Inhaúma class were initially designed as small frigates by the Brazilian Naval Design Office with assistance from the West German company Marine Technik. The initial complement was 162 including 19 officers but this too decreased over time to 145 including 15 officers.

The class is armed with four Exocet surface-to-surface missiles (SSM) placed centrally and a Mk 8  gun situated forward. They are equipped with two Bofors /70 anti-aircraft (AA) guns in a twin mount atop the aft superstructure. For anti-submarine warfare, the vessels mount Mk 32  torpedo tubes in two triple mounts sited on either side of the superstructure for Mk 46 torpedoes. A helicopter pad is located at the stern of the ship and is capable of operating a Westland Super Lynx helicopter. During the design phase, a Vuclan Phalanx close-in weapon system (CIWS) was intended for the stern. However, the class was considered top heavy and the idea was scrapped with the possibility of a surface-to-air missile mount in place instead. Further vessels were planned to have indigenous Brazilian missiles but this was shelved.

For sensors the Inhaúma class are fitted with Plessey AWS-4, Kelvin Hughes Type 1007 and Selenia Orion RTN 10X radar and Krupp Atlas ASO4 Mod 2 sonar. For electronic countermeasures, the vessels mount IPqM/Elabra Defensor ET SLR-1X radar intercept and IPqM/Elabra ET SLQ-1 radar jammers. They also mount two Plessey Shield chaff countermeasures. The ships have Ferranti CAAIS 450 (Computer Aided Action Information System) combat data systems and a SAAB EOS-400 fire control system.

Barroso subclass
An improved Inhaúma-class vessel, was ordered as a follow-on to the original class. This was done to improve the design's seakeeping and enlarge the engine room spaces. Barroso uses the same CODOG machinery setup as the basic Inhaúma-class ship and the same later complement of 145. Barroso carries the same missile and main gun, but secondary armament comprises a Bofors 40 mm/70 SAK Sea Trinity CIWS, two  machine guns and six ARES/DSAM SLT 324 mm torpedo tubes for the Mk 46 torpedoes.

Other design changes include a different combat data system in the IPqM/Esca Siconta Mk III system with Link YB. The fire control system is the Saab/Combitech EOS-400. The radar consists of the AESN RAN 20S surface search, the Terma Scanter 4100 navigational and the AESN RTN 30-Y for fire control. Sonar is the EDO 977F. Electronic countermeasure systems were similar to those carried by the first Inhaúma-class ships.

Ships in class

Construction and service
The first pair of Inhaúma-class ships were ordered for the Brazilian Navy on 15 February 1982 and the second pair on 9 January 1986. The number of ships in the class was initially intended to be 12, but this rose to 16 in 1986. The first two ships, Inhaúma and Jaceguai were constructed at the Arsenal de Marinha in Rio de Janeiro. The contracts for the second pair, Júlio de Noronha and Frontin, were awarded to Verolme. However, while the second pair were under construction, the shipyard went bankrupt in 1991 and the incomplete hulls were taken to the Arsenal de Marinha for completion. The government of Brazil sought to find cheaper corvettes to construct and as a result, the number of ships in the class was cut to the four under construction.

Inhaúma was the first to enter service in 1989 and Frontin was the last, in 1994. In 1994, a second improved version of the class comprising six ships was ordered by the Brazilian government from the Arsenal de Marinha. However, that version too was scaled back due to funding issues and only one, Barroso entered service in 2008. In late 2008, the Inhaúma class underwent modernisation. Beginning in 2015, Inhaúma-class ships began to be taken out of service. Frontin was the first to be taken out of service in 2015. On 17 April 2016, ex-Fortin was sunk in the Atlantic Ocean between Rio de Janeiro and Vitória in a naval exercise involving several warships of the Brazilian Navy. Inhaúma was taken out of service in 2016, followed by Jaceguai in 2019.

Citations

References

External links

 Inhaúma class frigates - Poder Naval OnLine (portuguese version only)
 Inhaúma Class Corvettes, Brazil

Corvette classes
Corvettes of the Brazilian Navy